The 1892 Georgia Tech football team represented Georgia Tech as an independent during the 1892 college football season. It was the team's inaugural season. Led by Ernest E. West in his first and only season as head coach, the team compiled a record of 0–3.

Schedule

References

Georgia Tech
Georgia Tech Yellow Jackets football seasons
College football winless seasons
Georgia Tech football